Livia Zita (born Lívia Zita Lokay on 21 December 1984 in Budapest, Hungary) is a Hungarian voiceover actress and rock singer, best known for her work with the Danish heavy metal band King Diamond, to which she belongs as a guest musician in studio and backing vocalist in live performances since 2003.

Biography 
Thanks to her marriage with King Diamond (Kim Bendix Petersen), Livia has also contributed to Diamond's band Mercyful Fate. She lives with her husband in Dallas, Texas, USA, and she's an American citizen, under her married name Livia Zita-Bendix Lokay.

She's also his business partner, and is working with him to compile old footage for two planned DVD releases of King Diamond and Mercyful Fate live performances. She also helped him make remastered editions of the King Diamond albums The Spider's Lullabye, The Graveyard, Voodoo and House of God.

Among her personal projects are voice over acting, the design of 3D art and artistic photographs, as well as working with clay, resin, cooked goods, and many more media.

She is also very health conscious, practicing yoga and contortion.

In 2017, Zita and King Diamond had their first son, Byron.

Discography

With King Diamond 
The Puppet Master - (2003)
Deadly Lullabyes - (Live Album,2004)
 Give Me Your Soul...Please - (2007)
Dreams of Horror - (Compilation album, 2014)

With Mercyful Fate 
Evil (Single) - (2009)

References

External links 
 

1984 births
Hungarian sopranos
Musicians from Budapest
King Diamond (band) members
Living people
21st-century Hungarian women singers